X'ed Out is the third studio album by American band Tera Melos. It was released on April 16, 2013, by Sargent House.

Track listing

References

2013 albums
Sargent House albums
Post-rock albums by American artists